The Gor-Ray Under-24 Championship was a golf tournament on the British PGA Circuit that was played in 1968 and 1969. The 1968 event was played over 72 holes but this was reduced to 54 holes in 1969. Total prize money was £1,250. It was played at Hartsbourne Golf Club and replaced the Gor-Ray Cup which had been restricted to assistants.

Winners

Oosterhuis was not eligible for prize money in 1969 as he was serving a six-month probationary period as a new PGA member.

References

Golf tournaments in England
Recurring sporting events established in 1968
Recurring events disestablished in 1969